"Solace" is a 1909 habanera written by Scott Joplin.

Music

Though Joplin labeled the piece "a Mexican Serenade", its origins are more probably Cuban, and it is considered to have a habanera (and tango) rhythm in three of the four strains – something unique for a work by Joplin, although a brief habanera bass did appear in his previous composition of that year, "Wall Street Rag".

"Solace" is marked "very slow march time", and while it is difficult to determine the intended speed, it has been played andante (around ♪112). The first two strains have a key signature of C major, while the third and fourth are in F major.

History
Similarities between Latin-American music and Joplin's more familiar ragtime had been noted as early as 1897 by Ben Harney. Tangos were introduced to the United States as early as 1860 by Louis Moreau Gottschalk's "Souvenir de la Havane". Perhaps the first example of tango composed by an African American was Jess Pickett's rag-tango "The Dream", played at the 1893 Chicago World's Fair. William H. Tyers' "Maori" was a famous African-American tango published a year before "Solace", though the two pieces do not share resemblance. In contrast, the first strain of "Solace" contains a theme closely resembling part of Will H. Etter's "Whoa! Maud", published four years before "Solace".

"Solace" was registered for copyright on April 28, 1909, when Joplin was in his early forties and recently married.

Alongside "Gladiolus Rag", "Pine Apple Rag", "The Ragtime Dance" and "The Entertainer", "Solace" was one of Joplin's compositions which featured in the soundtrack of the 1973 film The Sting and helped to revive his music's popularity.

Moreover, the song is also featured prominently in the 2013 video game Bioshock Infinite, which is set in a floating city in the year 1912.

Notes

References

External links
Sheet music at Wikimedia Commons
Sheet music at the Library of Congress website

1909 compositions
Compositions by Scott Joplin
Compositions for solo piano
Compositions in C major
Serenades
Contradanza
Tangos
Tango in the United States